Carina Witthöft was the defending champion, but chose not to participate.

Daria Kasatkina won the title, defeating Laura Siegemund in the final, 7–5, 7–6(7–4).

Seeds

Main draw

Finals

Top half

Bottom half

External Links
 Main draw

L'Open Emeraude Solaire de Saint-Malo - Singles
L'Open Emeraude Solaire de Saint-Malo
L'Open 35 de Saint-Malo